Anna-Karin Kammerling (born 19 October 1980) is a world-record breaking Swedish former swimmer, who was born in Malmö, Sweden.

Kammerling has twice lowered the world record in the 50-meter butterfly event. In 2000, she was a member of the 4×100 m freestyle team that were awarded bronze medals during the Summer Olympics.

Personal bests

Long course (50 m)

Short course (25 m)

Swimming events

Notes:
 World-best performance.
 World record.

Clubs
 Bollnäs SS
 Söderhamns SS
 Sundsvalls SS

References

External links
 
 Biography at FINA

1980 births
Living people
Swedish female butterfly swimmers
Swedish female freestyle swimmers
Olympic swimmers of Sweden
Swimmers at the 2000 Summer Olympics
Swimmers at the 2004 Summer Olympics
Swimmers at the 2008 Summer Olympics
Olympic bronze medalists for Sweden
World record setters in swimming
People from Bollnäs
Olympic bronze medalists in swimming
World Aquatics Championships medalists in swimming
Mid Sweden University alumni
Medalists at the FINA World Swimming Championships (25 m)
European Aquatics Championships medalists in swimming
Bollnäs SS swimmers
Söderhamns SS swimmers
Sundsvalls SS swimmers
Medalists at the 2000 Summer Olympics
Sportspeople from Malmö
21st-century Swedish women